Kavumbhagom or Kavumbhagam is a place in Thiruvalla, Pathanamthitta, Kerala, India. Kavumbhagom is an important junction and part of the Thiruvalla Municipality. It is also a census village.

Kavumbhagom serves as a major road route connecting Changanasserry, Thiruvalla, Chathankerry and Mavelikkara.  Thiruvalla Sree Vallabha temple is very near to Kavumbhagom. The junction also has two Hindu Temples, 'Erankavu Bhagavathi Kshetram' and 'Shri Anandeshwara Kshetram.
Traditionally, Kavumbhagom was the area around Karunattu Kaavu temple. It was the junction where Tiruvalla-Mavelikkara Road met the Kottayam-Mavelikkara route. As the new road was constructed from Ambili Junction in early 80s, the place which was formerly known as Erankavu started to be known as Kavumbhagom. The former Kavumbhagom Jn. is now called Anchal Kutty, thanks to the post box situated there.

History

Kavumbhagom is home to the Kaavil Market (no longer in existence) which was once one of the most famous markets of Kerala. This market was also popular among foreign trade links. Situated in the street commencing from Erankavu Temple to the Kaavil Temple in present-day Kavumbhagom, the houses in this street are still called "Kaavile Veedugal", and the houses in the Pushpagiri-Tholassery area are known as "Malayil" (Malayalam for on a hill) because it was situated on an elevated area when compared to the Kaavile Veedugal.  Kavumbhagom was also the first settlement area of the early Christians of Thiruvalla. Quotes about this famous street and its people are mentioned in the renowned poem "Unnuneeli Sandesham". Kavumbhagom was the heart-place of Thiruvalla all the way up to the 19th Century .

The first school in Thiruvalla was established in the mid-19th century in Kaavil Market right on the road to Pallippalam.

Facilities
 Hospitals: G.K. Hospital
 Schools: Devaswom Board Hindu Higher Secondary School, Kunnumpuram L.P. School
 Auditoriums: Kattappuram St. George Auditorium, Fr. Euachim Memorial Auditorium, Erankavu Temple Auditorium, Ebenezer Auditorium
 Theatre: New Jacobs Cinema

Places of worship 
Kavumbhagom, like the rest of Thiruvalla, is rich in the cultures of both Hinduism and Christianity.

The important temples are Karunattukavu Devi Temple, Sree Krishnaswamy Tamil Temple, Thiru Erankavu Bhagavathi Temple, Shri Anandeshwaram Shiva Temple, Kurichi Devi Temple, Nedumpallil Devi Temple, and the Plappallikkulangara Mahavishnu Temple.

The important churches are Kattappuram St. George Orthodox Church, St. George Syrian Jacobite Church, St. Mulk Orthodox Church, Ebenezer Marthoma Church, India Pentecostal Church of God, and the Bethel Assemblies of God Church.

Transport 
Kavumbhagom is a busy junction in the Thiruvalla-Kayankulam, Thiruvalla-Ambalappuzha as well as Idinjillam-Kavumbhagom route.

This junction is situated to the west of SCS Junction, the heart of Thiruvalla. The diversion, if coming through MC Road, is to be taken at the Cross Junction towards the Market Road. Kavumbhagom is in this route, which is also the route to the western side (such as Ambalappuzha or Kayankulam). The junctions en route are :Taluk Court Junction, Govt. Hospital Junction, Ramapuram Market Junction, and Ambili Junction.

Kavumbhagom is well-accessible by a fleet of KSRTC buses as well as private buses.

References

Villages in Pathanamthitta district
Thiruvalla